Franco Sebastián Cristaldo (born 15 August 1996) is an Argentine professional footballer who plays mainly as a midfielder for Grêmio.

Club career
Born in Morón, Buenos Aires, Cristaldo was a Boca Juniors youth graduate. On 16 November 2014 he made his first team debut, coming on as a second-half substitute for Luciano Acosta in a 1–1 away draw against Arsenal de Sarandí.

Cristaldo was definitely promoted to the main squad in January 2015 by manager Rodolfo Arruabarrena. He scored his first professional goal on 29 March, netting the last in a 3–0 home win against Estudiantes de la Plata.

On 11 January 2016 Cristaldo joined Elche CF in Segunda División, on loan until the end of the season.

Honours
Boca Juniors
 Argentine Primera División: 2015

References

External links
Boca Juniors profile 

1996 births
Living people
Argentine footballers
Argentine expatriate footballers
Argentina youth international footballers
Argentina under-20 international footballers
People from Morón Partido
Argentine people of Italian descent
Association football midfielders
Boca Juniors footballers
Elche CF players
Rayo Vallecano players
Defensa y Justicia footballers
San Martín de San Juan footballers
Central Córdoba de Santiago del Estero footballers
Club Atlético Huracán footballers
Argentine Primera División players
Segunda División players
Argentine expatriate sportspeople in Spain
Expatriate footballers in Spain
Sportspeople from Buenos Aires Province